Brachmia antichroa is a moth in the family Gelechiidae. It was described by Edward Meyrick in 1918. It is found in Sri Lanka.

The wingspan is about 20 mm. The forewings are brownish ochreous and the hindwings are grey.

References

Moths described in 1918
Brachmia
Taxa named by Edward Meyrick
Moths of Asia